Don Kaeo may refer to:

Don Kaeo, Mae Rim, a tambon (subdistrict) of Mae Rim District, in Chiang Mai Province, Thailand
Don Kaeo, Saraphi, a tambon (subdistrict) of Saraphi District, in Chiang Mai Province, Thailand